Munayshi (also known as Munayshy (Munayshı, مۇنايشى)) is a town in Mangystau Region, southwest Kazakhstan.

References

Mangystau Region
Cities and towns in Kazakhstan